Surbung Airport  is  a domestic airport located in Falam Township, Chin State of Myanmar. The airport is the first airport in Chin State and 69th airport of Myanmar. The airport is located west of Falam.

Construction began in April 2015 with the budget of US$26 million.

References 

Airports in Myanmar